Christine Boisson (born 8 April 1956) is a French actress.

Biography
After she registered in a model agency, Just Jaeckin liked her photo, and she got a part in the film Emmanuelle starring Sylvia Kristel, in which she played a lollipop-sucking teenager who masturbates over a picture of Paul Newman. Then she got some more film roles, but she also continued to study acting.

In 1977 she made her stage debut in Chekhov's The Seagull directed by Bruno Bayen.

In 1984, she received the Prix Romy Schneider (most promising actress awards) for Rue Barbare.

In 2005, she was starring in the stage play Viol by Botho Strauß (based on Titus Andronicus), directed by Luc Bondy.

In 2010 it was widely reported that she had attempted suicide after she climbed over the parapet of her 5th floor apartment and was stopped by firefighters. In a later interview she said she had done this after an argument with her partner at the time as an act of psychological manipulation, an action she was not proud of. She also described growing up with an abusive mother who constantly reminded her that she had almost died giving birth to her, and sexually abused both her and her brother.

Filmography

1973: The Mad Adventures of Rabbi Jacob - Une invitée au mariage (uncredited)
1974: Love at the Top (directed by Michel Deville) - Jeune fille nue chez Flora (uncredited)
1974: La Bonne Nouvelle (Short, directed by André Weinfeld) - Florence / The Sister
1974: Emmanuelle (1974, directed by Just Jaeckin) - Marie-Ange
1975: Playing with Fire (directed by Alain Robbe-Grillet) - Christina, la fille dans la malle / Desdémone
1975: Thomas - Sophie
1975: Divine
1975: Flic Story (directed by Jacques Deray) - Jocelyne
1976: Naked Massacre (directed by Denis Héroux) - Christine
1977: Adom ou Le sang d'Abel - La femme de Caïn
1980:  (directed by Jacques Bral) - Cora
1981: Seuls (directed by Francis Reusser) - Carole
1981: La chanson du mal aimé
1982: Identificazione di una donna (directed by Michelangelo Antonioni) - Ida
1982: Les ailes de la nuit (directed by Hans Noever) - Rosa
1984:  (directed by Gilles Béhat) - Emma-la-Rouge, dit 'Manu', membre de la bande à Manu
1984: Liberté la nuit (directed by Philippe Garrel) - Gémina
1984: Paris vu par... 20 ans après (directed by Philippe Garrel) - Genie (segment 3)
1986: L'aube (directed by Miklós Jancsó) - Iliana
1986: Rue du Départ (directed by Tony Gatlif) - Mimi
1986: Le passage (directed by René Manzor) - Catherine Diaz
1987: Jenatsch (directed by Daniel Schmid) - Nina
1987: Le moine et la sorcière (directed by Suzanne Shiffman) - Elda
1987: Unsettled Land (directed by Uri Barbash) - Sima
1988: La maison de jeanne (directed by Magali Clément) - Jeanne
1989: Radio corbeau (directed by Yves Boisset) - Agnès Deluca - journaliste à France Hebdo
1989: Un amour de trop - Sandra
1990: Il y a des jours... et des lunes (directed by Claude Lelouch) - La femme au petit caillou / The innkeeper's wife
1991: Caldo soffocante (directed by Giovanna Gagliardo) - Marie Christine
1992: My Wife's Girlfriends (directed by Didier Van Cauwelaert) - Victoire Jollin
1992: Oh pardon ! Tu dormais... (TV Movie, directed by Jane Birkin) - Elle
1993: Une nouvelle vie (directed by Olivier Assayas) - Laurence
1993: Les marmottes (directed by Élie Chouraqui) - Marie-Claire
1994: Pas très catholique (directed by Tonie Marshall) - Florence
1997: L'Homme idéal (directed by Xavier Gélin) - Nicole
2000: En face (directed by Mathias Ledoux) - Clémence / Housekeeper
2000: Only you (directed by Laetitia Masson) - The home's head mistress
2000: La mécanique des femmes (directed by Jérôme de Missolz)
2000: In extremis - Caroline
2000: La manipulation (directed by Nicolao Opritescu)
2002: The Truth About Charlie (directed by Jonathan Demme) - Commandant Dominique
2004: Maigret et L’Ombre Chinoise—The shadow Puppet (TV Series) - Germaine Martin
2004: La manipulation (directed by Marius Theodor Barna)
2008: J'ai rêvé sous l'eau - Fabienne
2009: All About Actresses - La prof de théâtre
2009: Une affaire d'état - Mado

Stage
1977-1978: La mouette by Anton Chekhov (directed by Bruno Bayen)
1978: La mouette reprise at Théâtre Nanterre-Amandiers
1978: Etre vidé (directed by Remo Girones)
1978: Et pourtant ce silence ne pouvait by Magnan
1978: Antoine et Cléopâtre by William Shakespeare
1978: Périples, prince de Tyr by Shakespeare (directed by Roger Planchon) - T.N.P. Villeurbanne
1979: Lorenzaccio by Alfred de Musset (directed by Otomar Krejča)
1980-1981: La trilogie du revoir by Botho Strauss (directed by Claude Régy) - Théâtre Nanterre-Amandiers
1981-1982: Grand et petit by Botho Strauss (directed by Claude Régy) - T.N.P. Villeurbanne
1984: Par les villages by Peter Handke (directed by Claude Régy) - Théâtre national de Chaillot
1988: Des sentiments soudains by Jean-Louis Livi (directed by Jean Bouchaud) - Théâtre de la Renaissance
1989: Andromaque by Racine (directed by Roger Planchon) - T.N.P. Villeurbanne
1991-1992: C'était hier by Harold Pinter (directed by Sami Frey) - Tour
1993: La mégère apprivoisée by William Shakespeare (directed by Jérôme Savary) - Théâtre national de Chaillot, Théâtre de Nice
1995: Démons by Lars Norén (directed by Gérard Desarthe) - Théâtre de Vidy Lausanne, Tour 1996
1998: Ashes to Ashes by Harold Pinter (directed by Harold Pinter) - Théâtre du Rond-Point des Champs-Élysées
2001: Les monologues du vagin by Eve Ensler (directed by François-Louis Tilly) - Petit Théâtre de Paris
2002: La campagne by Martin Crimp (directed by Louis-Do de Lencquesaing)
2002: Le collier d'Hélène by Carole Frechette (directed by Michel Dumoulin)
2003: Les monologues du vagin
2005: Viol by Botho Strauss (directed by Luc Bondy)

References

External links

1956 births
Living people
People from Salon-de-Provence
French film actresses
French stage actresses
20th-century French actresses
21st-century French actresses
French National Academy of Dramatic Arts alumni